The 1951 Montana Grizzlies football team represented the University of Montana in the 1951 college football season as a member of the Skyline Conference. The Grizzlies were led by third-year head coach Ted Shipkey, played their home games on campus at Dornblaser Field in Missoula, and finished with a record of two wins and seven losses (2–7, 1–4 MSC).

Schedule

References

External links
1951 Grizzly football yearbook
 Game program: Montana at Washington State – November 17, 1951

Montana
Montana Grizzlies football seasons
Montana Grizzlies football